Samra Bukhari is a Pakistani novelist, screenwriter and playwright. She has written several television series for the satellite television networks in Pakistan since 2011 and is also associated with writing for Urdu Journals and Digest. Some of her commercially successful series are Kis Din Mera Viyah Howay Ga (2011), Gohar-e-Nayab (2013), Gul-e-Rana (2015), Ghar Titli Ka Par (2017), Silsilay (2018).

Notable work

Novels 

 Aainon Kay Dais May
 Hum Say Hai Zamana 
 Apni Manzil Apnay Rastay
 Band Honton Ki Baat
 Daairon Kay Darmiyan
 Dill Da Dais
 Hasti Kay Aahang
 Chahay Jo Puray Dill Say
 Aik Faisla Uska Tha
 Dil Kay Andar Ik Rasta Hai
 Aabaad Hain Tujh Say Mairay Khwaab

Television series

 Hulla Ray
 Kis Din Mera Viyah Howay Ga
 Jazeera
 Meka Aur Susral
 Gul-e-Rana
 Bholi Bano
 Hiddat
 Ghar Titli Ka Par
 Silsilay
 Seep
 Lmahay
 Piya Naam Ka Diya
 Aik Aur Munafiq – Jhatka
 Mujhay Vida Kar
 Paristan

References

External links 
 Smara Bukhari at IMDb

Living people
Year of birth missing (living people)
Pakistani novelists